Bae Sung-jae (born 15 May 1978) is a South Korean television personality, sportscaster, radio DJ and announcer.

Personal life 
While working at KBS Gwangju Broadcasting Center, he moved to 14 SBS jobs in 2006 to become a sports caster after about 1 year and 6 months after joining. After passing SBS, MBC also received a call to come for the 3rd interview, but it is said that he declined.

SBS, which won the exclusive broadcasting rights for the 2010 World Cup in South Africa, chose Bae Sung-jae as the main caster, breaking through the 4:1 in-house competition rate according to SBS's policy to foster young announcers. He becomes known as a broadcaster with a lot of soccer knowledge while being witty with commentator Cha Bum-geun.

He became known as a soccer caster, and has been an anchor for sports news on SBS 8 News since November 2012.

On November 9, 2015, starting at 10 pm on the weekend, he succeeded K.Will as the DJ of Power FM Bae Sung-jae's weekend United's, which is broadcast for an hour.

In April 2016, through a radio reorganization, Bae Sung-jae's Weekend United was expanded to Bae Sung-jae's Ten, and he is in charge of DJing for an hour starting at 10 pm every night.

On February 16, 2021, an article appeared stating that he submitted his resignation to SBS.

Since March 1, 2021, just after leaving SBS, he has been active as a caster of the K-League 1 broadcaster of the Korea Professional Football Federation.

Filmography

Television shows

Web shows

Hosting

Awards and nominations

References

External links

 Bae Sung-jae on Instagram

1978 births
Living people
South Korean announcers
South Korean sports announcers
South Korean radio presenters
Hanyang University alumni